Thrixspermum carinatifolium, commonly known as the Christmas Island hairseed, is an epiphytic orchid with flattened, straggly stems that form clumps with many branching aerial roots. It has flattened fleshy leaves arranged in two ranks along the stems and white or yellowish, widely opening flowers. This orchid occurs from Peninsular Malaysia to Christmas Island, an Australian territory.

Description
The middle lobe is thick and egg-shaped with a curved sac and rounded callus. Flowering occurs sporadically.

Taxonomy and naming
The Christmas Island hairseed was first formally described in 1891 by Henry Ridley who gave it the name Sarcochilus carinitifolius and published the description in Journal of the Straits Branch of the Royal Asiatic Society. In 1911, Rudolf Schlechter changed the name to Thrixspermum carinatifolium. The specific epithet (carinatifolium) is derived from the Latin words carinatus meaning "keeled" and folium meaning "leaf".

Distribution and habitat
Thrixspermum carinatifolium grows on the upper branches of rainforest trees, sometimes near the sea. It occurs in Java, southeast Johor and Aur Island in Peninsular Malaysia, Sumatra and Christmas Island.

References

carinatifolium
Orchids of Australia
Orchids of Indonesia
Plants described in 1891